Beatrice Municipal Airport  is  north of Beatrice, in Gage County, Nebraska.

Frontier DC-3s stopped there from 1959 to 1963.

Facilities

In the year ending June 7, 2016 the airport had 10,175 aircraft operations, an average of 28 per day: 99% general aviation, 1% air taxi and <1% military. In January 2017, 36 aircraft were based at the airport, all single-engine. The terminal has wireless internet.

Airlines and Destinations

Cargo 
Beatrice has scheduled cargo service on Ameriflight

References

External links 
 

Airports in Nebraska
Buildings and structures in Gage County, Nebraska